Fucosyltransferase 4 is a protein that in humans is encoded by the FUT4 gene.

Function

The product of this gene transfers fucose to N-acetyllactosamine polysaccharides to generate fucosylated carbohydrate structures. It catalyzes the synthesis of the non-sialylated antigen, Lewis x (CD15). [provided by RefSeq, Jan 2009].

References

Further reading